Don Bousquet (born 1948) is a Rhode Island–based cartoonist. He was born in Pawtucket, Rhode Island. His cartoon Bousquet regularly appears in The Providence Journal, Rhode Island Monthly, and the South County Independent  and his work has also appeared in numerous other publications, such as Yankee Magazine. Most of Bousquet's best sellers were published by Covered Bridge Press. On March 29, 2014, Bousquet retired from one of his most visible platforms, his Sunday placement in The Providence Journal, and would be "winding down" his drawing.

Business
Bousquet and his son started up a company named Don Bousquet and Son Aerial Photography. Their business has been taking photos in the sky since the 1980s. Their photos have been used for a number of occasions which include: the promotion of events, selling of real estate, and advertisements.

Family
Bousquet has two sons named Nathan and Michael. He and his wife Laura live in South County, RI.

Partial bibliography
Beware of the Quahog (out of print) Covered Bridge Press
I Brake for Quahogs (out of print)
The Quahog Walks Among Us (out of print)
The New England Experience (Yankee Books, 1987; out of print)
Don Bousquet's New England (out of print)
Best of the Quahog Trilogy (out of print) 
The Quahog Stops Here
Quahogs Are a Girl's Best Friend (Covered Bridge Press)
A Rhode Island Album
Don Bousquet's Next Book
Revenge of the Quahog
A Workingmans Skiff (with William Campbell)
Rhode Island Dictionary (with Mark Patinkin)
Rhode Island Handbook (with Mark Patinkin)
New England Fish Tale
Quahog State of Mind (1995) 
Don Bousquet's Rhode Island Cookbook (with Martha Murphy)
The Don Bousquet Greeting Card Collection

References

1948 births
American cartoonists
Living people
People from Pawtucket, Rhode Island